In geometry, the medial deltoidal hexecontahedron is a nonconvex isohedral polyhedron. It is the dual of the rhombidodecadodecahedron. Its 60 intersecting quadrilateral faces are kites.

Proportions 
The dihedral angle equals . Part of each kite lies inside the solid, hence is invisible in solid models.

References

External links 
 
 Uniform polyhedra and duals

Dual uniform polyhedra